Nicholas are an American traditional black gospel music husband and wife duo from Philadelphia, Pennsylvania and Los Angeles, California, and they started their music recording careers in 1981, as a quartet, with the release of Tell the World with Message Records, yet this failed to chart. They released, Words Can't Express, in 1983 with Message Records, which would be their last album released by them, and this was their Billboard magazine breakthrough release upon the Gospel Albums chart. Their other albums were released by Command Records, starting in 1985, with the release of Dedicated, and this charted #1 on the aforementioned chart. The duo released nine more albums with four of those placing upon the Gospel Albums chart, 1987's A Love Like This, 1989's Live in Memphis, 1990's More than Music, and 1992's Back to Basics. Their last album release happened in 1994 with Fired Up!

Background
The origins of the duo date back to Philip Nicholas' father who was a repentant Jazz musician, and he became a minister of music around his hometown of Philadelphia, Pennsylvania. While in high school, Philip acquired the ability to play the piano, which he utilized in his family band, The Nicholas Chorale Ensemble, that counted as its members Philip's brother, Lonnie, nephews, Steve and Ira Jackson, and a number of other friends and family members on a revolving basis.

Philip went to college in his hometown at Drexel University. He was very close friends with a young lady named Diane. She united Philip with a dorm-mate of hers, Brenda Watson, because Brenda was a loud, early morning, shower songstress in the dormitory bathroom. Diane felt that bringing Brenda to Philip's singing group would give her dormitory floor well earned relief from Brenda's early morning shower concerts. Brenda and Philip would soon hit it off both in their professional and personal lives, marrying on February 18, 1978, that just happened to be on Philip's 24th birthday.

After completing college and marrying in New Jersey, the duo settled in Los Angeles, California where they became musical ministers at the renowned pastor, Dr. E.V. Hill's church. In pursuit of their professional music career, they coined the group name, Nicholas. They tried and failed to release albums with Motown Records, so Philip alongside partner and brother, Lonnie Nicholas, they established their own record label, Message Records in 1981. At this time the group was a quartet, with another female (Linda Laury Harold) and nephew (Steve Jackson) as the main vocalist. This brotherly owned label would soon cease, when Philip and Lonnie differed over the labels direction, causing Philip to depart, and creating Command Records with ex-Motown producer, Kent Washburn.

History
The duo, but quartet at the time, released albums in 1981 entitled Tell the World, Words Can't Express in 1983, in 1985 the album Dedicated, and a 12 inch single Tell Somebody/God's Woman in 1985. Two of these albums charted, Word's Can't Express and Dedicated, and they placed at Nos. 10 and 1 respectively on the Billboard magazine Gospel Albums chart.

The remaining albums released by the husband and wife duo with Command Records were, 1987's A Love Like This, 1988's Live in Memphis, Contemporary, and Inspirational, 1990's More than Music, 1991's Back to Basics, 1993's The Inspirational Sounds Of Nicholas Vol. 1, and lastly, 1994's Fired Up! Four of these albums charted on the aforementioned chart, A Live Like This at No. 2, Live in Memphis at No. 10, More than Music at No. 14, and Back to Basics at No. 12.

Members
 Philip W. Nicholas (born February 18, 1954 in Philadelphia, Pennsylvania)
 Brenda L. Nicholas (née Watson) (born December 16, 1953 in Salem, New Jersey)

Discography

References

External links
 Official website
 Cross Rhythms artist profile

American musical duos
Musical groups established in 1981
Musical groups from Los Angeles
Musical groups from Philadelphia